"Mercenary Man" is the third track on the Greek power metal band Firewind's fifth studio album The Premonition. It was released for streaming on Firewind's Myspace page on February 2, 2008 but only physically released as a single in Greece, on February 25, 2008. The song was also released on several models of Walkman in 2008.
Also "Mercenary Man" is the track on the band Geordie (band)'s album "Don't Be Fooled by the Name" (1974).

Music video
The music video for "Mercenary Man" was filmed in Sweden and produced by Patric Ullaeus.

Track list
"Mercenary Man" – 3:28
"My Loneliness" – 4:04
"Spirits in a Digital World" – 4:04
"Mercenary Man [Acoustic]" – 3:54

Charts
 Greek Top 50 – #5

Footnotes

Firewind songs
2008 singles
Music videos directed by Patric Ullaeus